Manz is a surname. Notable people with the surname include:

Beatrice Forbes Manz, American historian
Cecilie Manz (born 1972), Danish industrial designer
Daniel Manz (born 1987), German taekwondo practitioner
Felix Manz (c. 1498–1527), Swiss Anabaptist
Hans Peter Manz (born 1955), Austrian diplomat
Jacob Manz (1837–1916), American engraver
John R. Manz (born 1945), American Roman Catholic bishop
Linda Manz (1961–2020), American actress
Paul Manz (1919–2009), American composer 
Sebastian Manz (born 1986), German clarinetist
Sümeyye Manz (born 1989),  German taekwondo practitioner
Wilhelm von Manz (1804–1867), Bavarian Lieutenant General and war minister
Wolfgang Manz (born 1960), German pianist